Vladivostok railway station is a railway station in Vladivostok, Russia. It is the eastern terminus of the Trans-Siberian Railway. Also, Aeroexpress (Express Primorya) from this station to Vladivostok International Airport (Knevichi Railway Station) are operated.

History
The author of the project, architect P.E. Bazilevsky, took part in laying the station building, laying the first stone of the structure on May 19 (31), 1891 in the presence of Tsarevich Nikolai Aleksandrovich, the future emperor Nicholas II. On November 2, 1893, a solemn consecration of the station took place, and a rail link along the route Vladivostok - Ussuriysk was opened.

Initially, it was a stone building with an iron roof, in the middle of the one-story, on the edges - a two-story. The floors in the building were covered with clay Japanese plates - they are well preserved to this day. In 1910–1912, in connection with the construction of Moscow Yaroslavsky railway station, the station in Vladivostok was designed and expanded by the civil engineering engineer V. A. Planson in the image and similarity of Yaroslavsky, creating architecturally finished stations at both ends of the Trans-Siberian railway. The original building became one of the parts of the railway station. On the western facade was the mosaic coat of arms of the Primorskaya Oblast, and on the east - the coat of arms of Moscow.
Since 1924, the appearance of the building began to change gradually: a two-headed eagle was shot, mosaic panels with coats of arms disappeared under a layer of plaster, and relief images of glazed ceramics on Russian folklore and fairy tales. The color of the facade has changed from yellow to green. In 1936, the interiors of the station were painted by the artist G. Grigorovich, and twenty years later V. Gerasimenko painted the ticket hall, creating a panel “Our Great Motherland” there.
In the seventies and eighties of the twentieth century, the outer walls were painted green. The restoration of the building, carried out between 1994 and 1996 by the Russian-Italian company Tegola Canadese, brought the building closer to its pre-revolutionary appearance.

Gallery

References

Trans-Siberian Railway
Railway stations in the Russian Empire opened in 1893
Buildings and structures in Vladivostok
Railway stations in Primorsky Krai
Transport in Vladivostok